Purlisa is a butterfly genus in the family Lycaenidae. It is monotypic, containing only the species Pulisa giganteus. It is known from Malaysia.

References

 
Lycaenidae genera
Monotypic butterfly genera
Lepidoptera of Malaysia
Taxa named by William Lucas Distant